Jaws: The Revenge is a 1987 American horror film produced and directed by Joseph Sargent. It is a direct sequel to Jaws 2, ignoring the events of Jaws 3-D, and is the fourth and final film in the franchise. Lorraine Gary reprised her role from the first two films while new cast members include Lance Guest, Mario Van Peebles, Karen Young and Sir Michael Caine.

The film focuses on a now-widowed Ellen Brody (Lorraine Gary) after Chief Brody died from a heart attack, her conviction that a great white shark is seeking revenge on her family, particularly when it kills her son, and follows her to the Bahamas. Jaws: The Revenge was shot on location in New England and in the Bahamas, and completed on the Universal lot. As with the first two films, Martha's Vineyard was the location of the fictional Amity Island for the opening scenes.

While production of the other three films in the series took around two years each, Jaws: The Revenge was made in less than nine months. According to associate producer and production manager Frank Baur during the sequel's filming, "This (Revenge) will be the fastest I have ever seen a major film planned and executed in all of my 35 years as a production manager." The lowest grossing film of the franchise with only $51.9 million, it was universally lambasted by critics, who criticized the story, acting, and effects. The film introduced the infamous tagline "This time, it's personal."

Plot
On Amity Island, Martin Brody, famous for his role as the police chief and his heroism, has died from a heart attack. Martin's widow, Ellen, still lives in Amity, close to her younger son, Sean, and his fiancée, Tiffany. Sean works as a police deputy. When he is dispatched to clear a log from a buoy a few days before Christmas, a great white shark appears and tears off his arm. He screams for help, but the singing on land drowns out his cries. The shark sinks his boat and drags him underwater to his death.

Martin's older son, Michael, his wife, Carla, and their five-year-old daughter, Thea, come to Amity for the funeral. Michael is working in the Bahamas as a marine biologist and on his arrival, Ellen demands that he stop his work. Having just received his first grant, Michael is reluctant. Thea convinces Ellen to return to the Bahamas with them.

The pilot of their small plane, Hoagie, takes an interest in Ellen when he flies them back. Wanting to take her mind off her recent losses and finding herself attracted, she begins spending time with him. Michael introduces his mother to his colleague Jake and his wife Louisa, and they spend Christmas and New Year's together.

A few days later, Michael, Jake, and their crew encounter the shark, which followed the family from Amity. Jake is eager to research it because great white sharks have never been seen in the Bahamas due to the warm water. Michael asks him not to mention the shark to his family. During the day, Ellen can keep her mind off the shark, but at night she has nightmares of being attacked by it. She is also able to feel when the shark is about to attack one of her loved ones.

Jake decides to attach a device to the shark that can track it through its heartbeat. Using chum to attract it, Jake stabs the device's tracking pole into the shark's side. The next day, the shark ambushes and chases Michael through a sunken ship, and he narrowly escapes.

Thea goes on an inflatable banana boat with her friend Margaret and her mother. While Carla presents her new art sculpture, the shark attacks the back of the boat, killing Margaret's mother. After Thea is safe, Ellen boards Jake's boat to track down the shark, intending to kill it to save her family. After hearing about what happened, Michael confesses he knew about the shark, infuriating Carla.

Michael and Jake are flown by Hoagie to search for Ellen, and find the shark in pursuit of their boat. During the search, Hoagie explains to Michael about Ellen's belief that the shark that killed Sean is hunting her family. When they find her, Hoagie lands the plane on the water, ordering Michael and Jake to swim to the boat as the shark drags the plane and Hoagie underwater.

Hoagie escapes from the shark, and Jake and Michael hastily put together a device that emits electrical impulses. As Jake moves to the front of the boat, the shark lunges up and mauls him. Jake manages to get the device into the shark's mouth before being dragged underwater. Michael begins blasting the shark with the impulses, which drive it mad; it repeatedly jumps out of the water, roaring in pain.

Michael continues blasting the shark with the impulses, causing it to leap out of the water again. Ellen steers the sailboat towards the shark, while thinking back to the shark's attack on Thea and also imagining Sean's death - and Martin defeating the first shark. As the shark is rearing up, she rams the broken bowsprit of the boat into it. 

In the original version of the film that was screened in the U.S., the shark bleeds out heavily and dies after being impaled. In the revised ending (for international theaters and DVD release), the impaling causes the shark to immediately explode and its corpse sinks to the bottom of the ocean (with re-used footage from the first film). Also in the revised ending, Michael hears Jake calling for help, seriously injured but still alive (Jake died in the original cut). A short time later, Hoagie flies Ellen back to Amity Island.

Cast

Production

Development
As MCA Universal was going through a difficult period, its CEO Sidney Sheinberg saw that a third sequel to Jaws was likely to make a good profit, following the commercial success of Jaws 3-D, despite generally attracting negative reviews. Sheinberg also saw an opportunity to promote the Jaws ride at Universal Studios.

Joseph Sargent produced and directed the film. He had worked with Lorraine Gary in 1973's The Marcus-Nelson Murders, for which he won his first Directors Guild of America Award. Indeed, Steven Spielberg cites this television film, which later spawned Kojak, as motivation for casting Gary as Ellen Brody in the original Jaws film, besides the fact she was the wife of the studio's chief executive Sidney Sheinberg at that time. In regards to Revenge, Gary remarked in an interview: "I made a good deal on this film, but I didn't make as good a deal as I would have if I weren't married to Sid."

In an interview with the Boston Herald, Sargent called Revenge "a ticking bomb waiting to go off. ... Sid Sheinberg (president of MCA Inc., parent company of Universal Pictures) expects a miracle – and we're going to make it happen." Sargent got a call from Sheinberg in late September 1986, asking him to direct the fourth Jaws movie with no script yet written. Said Sargent, "I didn't have time to laugh because Sid explained he wanted to do a quality picture about human beings. When he told me, 'It's your baby, you produce and direct,' I accepted." According to Sargent, Sheinberg "cut through all the slow lanes and got Jaws: The Revenge off and running." In a 2006 interview, Sargent stated that the premise was born "out of a little bit of desperation to find something fresh to do with the shark. We thought that maybe if we take a mystical point of view, and go for a little bit of ... magic, we might be able to find something interesting enough to sit through."

The studio fast-tracked Jaws: The Revenge into production in September 1986 so that it could be released the following summer. The principal script by Michael Guzman, known for his TV work, was written in five weeks; however, the final shooting script had not been completed when filming began. Actors from the original film, Roy Scheider, who had been proposed as the shark’s first victim, and Richard Dreyfuss refused to participate. The film has no continuity from Jaws 3-D. In its predecessor, Mike is an engineer for SeaWorld, whereas in Jaws: The Revenge, he is a marine research scientist. One of the Universal press releases for Jaws: The Revenge refers to Jaws: The Revenge as the "third film of the remarkable Jaws trilogy." The underwater chase scene between Mike and the shark in Revenge was lifted from an early screenplay draft of Jaws 3-D.

Casting
Lorraine Gary portrayed Ellen Brody in the first two films. In a press release, Gary says Jaws: The Revenge''' is "also about relationships which ... makes it much more like the first Jaws." This was Gary's first film role since she had appeared in Spielberg's 1941 eight years earlier, as well as being her final film role.

The press release proposes that the character "had much more depth and texture than either of the other films was able to explore. The promise of further developing this multi-dimensional woman under the extraordinary circumstances ... intrigued Gary enough to lure her back to the screen after a lengthy hiatus." Although the film was always going to be centered on Gary, Roy Scheider was offered a cameo. If he had accepted it, it was his Martin Brody character, rather than Sean Brody, who would have been killed by the shark at the film's beginning.

Gary is the only principal cast member from the original film who returned, although Lee Fierro made a brief cameo as Mrs. Kintner (the mother of Alex M. Kintner who was killed in Jaws), as did Fritzi Jane Courtney, who played Mrs. Taft, one of the Amity town council members in both Jaws and Jaws 2. Cyprian R. Dube, who played Amity Selectman Mr. Posner in both Jaws and Jaws 2, is upgraded to mayor following the death of Murray Hamilton, who played Larry Vaughan, the mayor in the first two Jaws films.

Gary states that one of the reasons she was attracted to the film was the idea of an on-screen romance with Oscar winner Michael Caine. Caine had previously starred in another Peter Benchley-adapted flop, The Island.

The first day we were to work together I was nervous as a school girl. We were shooting a Junkanoo Festival with noisy drums and hundreds of extras. But he never faltered in his concentration and he put me completely at ease. It was all so natural. He's an extraordinary actor – and just a nice human being.

Caine had mixed feelings about both the production and the final version. He thinks that it was a first for him to be involved with someone his own age in a film. He compares the relationship between two middle-aged people to the romance between two teenagers. Although disappointed not to be able to collect an Academy Award because of filming in the Bahamas, he was glad to be involved in the film. In the press release, he explains that "it is part of movie history ... the original was one of the great all-time thrillers. I thought it might be nice to be mixed up with that. I liked the script very much." However, Caine later claimed: "I have never seen it [the film], but by all accounts it is terrible. However, I have seen the house that it built, and it is terrific!" In his 1992 autobiography What's it All About?, he says that the film "will go down in my memory as the time when I won an Oscar, paid for a house and had a great holiday. Not bad for a flop movie."

Lance Guest played Ellen's eldest son Mike. Guest had dropped out of his sophomore year at UCLA (1981) to appear in another sequel to a horror classic; Halloween II. Karen Young played his wife Carla. She commended the director's emphasis upon characterization.

Mario Van Peebles played Jake, Michael's colleague. His father, Melvin Van Peebles, has a cameo in the film as Nassau's mayor. Mitchell Anderson appeared as Ellen's youngest son, Sean. Lynn Whitfield played Louisa, and stunt performer Diane Hetfield was the victim of the banana boat attack.

Filming
Principal photography for Jaws: The Revenge took place on location in New England and in the Bahamas, and completed on the Universal lot. Like the first two films of the series, Martha's Vineyard was the location of the fictional Amity Island for the film's opening scenes. Production commenced on February 2, 1987, by which time "snowstorms had blanketed" the island for almost a month, "providing a frosty backdrop for the opening scenes." Because the sequel had to be ready for release by July of the same year and the mechanical shark had to be filmed in warmer temperatures, Martha's Vineyard only makes a cameo appearance in Revenge.

In addition to the 124 cast and crew members, 250 local extras were also hired. The majority of the extras were used as members of the local high school band, chorus and dramatic society that can be seen as the Brodys walk through the town, and during Sean's attack. A local gravestone maker produced 51 slabs for the mock graveyard used for Sean's funeral.

The cast and crew moved to Nassau in the Bahamas on February 9, beginning principal photography there the next day. Like the production of the first two films, they encountered many problems with varying weather conditions. The location did not offer the "perfect world" that the 38-day shoot required. Cover shots were filmed on shore and in interior sets. The film was shot in the Super 35 format.

Special effects

The special effects team, headed by Henry Millar, had arrived at South Beach, Nassau on January 12, 1987, almost a month before principal photography commenced there. In the official press release, Millar says that when he became involved "we didn't even have a script ... but as the story developed and they started telling us all what they wanted ... I knew this wasn't going to be like any other shark anyone had ever seen."

Seven sharks, or segments, were produced.

Two models were fully articulated, two were made for jumping, one for ramming, one was a half shark (the top half) and one was just a fin. The two fully articulated models each had 22 sectioned ribs and movable jaws covered by a flexible water-based latex skin, measured  in length and weighed 2500 pounds. Each tooth was half-a-foot long and as sharp as it looked. All models were housed under cover ... in a secret location on the island.

The film company returned to Universal to finish shooting on April 2. Principal photography was completed in Los Angeles on May 26. Millar's special effects team, however, remained in Nassau, completing second unit photography on June 4.

Underwater sequences
Cinematographer John McPherson also supervised the underwater unit, which was headed by Pete Romano. Whereas underwater photography was normally filmed with an anamorphic lens, requiring overhead lighting, Romano filmed these "sequences with Zeiss, a 35 mm super-speed lens, which allows the natural ambiance to come through on film." Also, a replica of Nassau's Clifton Bay and its skyline was created on the man-made Falls Lake on the studio backlot.

A television documentary, "Behind the Scenes with Jaws: The Revenge", was broadcast in the U.S. on July 10, 1987. Twenty-two minutes in length, it was written and directed by William Rus for Zaloom Mayfield Productions.

Ending changes
In the original theatrical version's ending, Ellen rammed the shark with Mike's boat, mortally wounding it. The shark then causes the boat to break apart with its death contortions, forcing the people on the boat to jump off to avoid going down with it. American audiences disapproved of this ending. Following this, a different ending was ordered to be shot for foreign distribution in which the shark gets stabbed with the bow sprit and then inexplicably explodes, with Jake being found wounded but alive. Universal used this ending on home media releases.

A rumor persisted that the re-shooting of the ending prevented Michael Caine from collecting his Academy Award for Hannah and Her Sisters in person. The re-shot ending reportedly began filming only five days after the film was released in the United States. The new ending was  the version released in other Western countries.  The original ending can only be seen on cable broadcasts and has not been released on any home video format. In his review of the film, Roger Ebert said that he could not believe "[t]hat the director, Joseph Sargent, would film this final climactic scene so incompetently that there is not even an establishing shot, so we have to figure out what happened on the basis of empirical evidence."

Music

The score was composed and conducted by Michael Small, who had previously provided music for Klute, Marathon Man (both of which featured Jaws star Roy Scheider) and The Parallax View. John Williams' original shark motif is integrated into the score, although Small removed the Orca theme. Soundtrack.net says that "Small's score is generally tense, and he comes up with a few new themes of his own." The film also contained the songs "Nail it to the Wall", performed by Stacy Lattisaw, and the 1986 hit "You Got It All", performed by The Jets.

A soundtrack album was announced when the film opened; however, the release was cancelled following the film's disappointing performance at the box office. A promotional version of the album was released in 2000 on Audio CD and Compact Cassette. Reviews for the soundtrack album were more favorable than for the film. Indeed, writing for Film Score Monthly, AK Benjamin says that "on a CD, Small's material fares better since it's not accompanied by the film." Dismissing the film as "engagingly unwatchable", he says that "Small certainly gave Revenge a lot more than it deserved – and this a much better score than Deep Blue Sea ... whatever that means." Benjamin portrays Small as 'knowing' and his work as being superior to the film.

The hysterical coda tacked onto the end of "Revenge and Finale" is almost worth the price of the disc, as it no doubt sums up Small's opinion of the film. It's sad that the great Michael Small was delegated utter crap like Jaws the Revenge in the late '80s – and even worse that he never found his way back to the material that he deserves.

Upon Small's death in 2003, The Independent wrote that the "composer of some distinction ... had the indignity of working on one of the worst films of all time". Like most reviews of the soundtrack, the article criticizes the film whilst saying "Small produced a fine score in the circumstances, as if anyone noticed."

In 2015, Intrada Records, which previously reissued Jaws 3-D on compact disc, released the complete score. Intrada was given access to the complete session mixes, meaning that the disc included every cue recorded, including alternate print takes of several cues.

Release
The film opened at the height of summer on July 17, 1987, in 1,606 theaters, where it debuted in third place, behind RoboCop and a re-screening of Snow White and The Seven Dwarfs. In its opening weekend, the film grossed $7,154,890, almost half of what Jaws 3-D had grossed in its first weekend. Jaws: The Revenge was only in the top 10 for two weeks, before dropping to No. 12 in its third week. By the end of its theatrical run, Jaws: The Revenge had grossed a worldwide total of $51,881,013. Although this made it a financial success on its $23 million budget, Jaws: The Revenge grossed by far the lowest of the entire Jaws franchise: the original film grossed nine times more in 1975 on only 675 theaters.

Television airingsJaws: The Revenge was originally screened on AMC in the United States and on BBC in the United Kingdom. The AMC version includes a number of deleted and extended scenes that were removed from the original theatrical release. These include spoken narration prior to the opening credits explaining that some circumstances can be due to fate, and more dialogue between Ellen and Hoagie as well as between Michael and Jake. There are additional shots of the shark diving towards the submersible and slightly different angles showing Jake's death.

Some airings of Jaws: The Revenge, most notably on the BBC, have not cropped the frames shown, meaning that most of the shark's internal machinery on its underside is visible during attack sequences.

Home mediaJaws: The Revenge was the first film of the series to be released on DVD. It was released on Region 1 as a 'vanilla' disc by Goodtimes, featuring Spanish and French subtitles. The feature is presented in a non-anamorphic 2.35:1 widescreen transfer. The soundtrack was presented in Dolby Digital 4.1, with one reviewer saying that the "stereo separation is great with ocean waves swirling around you, the bubbles going by during the scuba scenes, and Hoagie's airplane flying around behind you." The same reviewer praised the image transfer of McPherson's "extremely well photographed" cinematography. The film was re-released on DVD by Universal on June 3, 2003, in an anamorphic transfer. In 2015, Jaws: The Revenge was re-released on DVD as part of a three movie multi-pack, along with Jaws 2 and Jaws 3-D.

Universal Pictures released Jaws: The Revenge on Blu-ray on June 14, 2016. The bonus features on the disc are the film's theatrical trailer and the restored original theatrical ending in high definition.

Reception
Critical responseJaws: The Revenge was universally panned by critics and audiences alike. On Rotten Tomatoes, with 41 reviews, the film has an approval rating of 0%, with an average rating of 2.7/10. The critical consensus reads, "Illogical, tension-free and filled with cut-rate special effects, Jaws: The Revenge is a sorry chapter in a once-proud franchise." On Metacritic, the film has a weighted average score of 15 out of 100, based on 15 critics, indicating "overwhelming dislike". Audiences polled by CinemaScore gave the film an average grade of "C−" on an A+ to F scale.

For her performance, Gary was nominated for both a Saturn Award for Best Actress and a Golden Raspberry Award for Worst Actress; she lost to Jessica Tandy for *batteries not included and Madonna for Who's That Girl, respectively. It was rated by Entertainment Weekly as one of "The 25 Worst Sequels Ever Made". It was voted number 22 by readers of Empire magazine in their list of The 50 Worst Movies Ever.

Roger Ebert of the Chicago Sun-Times gave the film zero stars, writing in his review that it "is not simply a bad movie, but also a stupid and incompetent one." He lists several elements that he finds unbelievable, including that Ellen is "haunted by flashbacks to events where she was not present". Ebert joked that Caine could not attend the ceremony to accept his Academy Award for Best Supporting Actor earned for Hannah and Her Sisters because of his shooting commitments on this film, because he may not have wanted to return to the shoot if he had left it. On their review show, both Ebert and his colleague Gene Siskel slated the film, also pointing out a number of "logical errors amongst many logical errors" including a scene near the end where Michael Caine's shirt is dry despite having just hauled himself out of the water. Siskel concluded his review by saying "let's hope this is the end of the Jaws saga".

Many scenes are considered implausible, such as the shark swimming from a Massachusetts island to the Bahamas (approx. ) in less than three days, somehow knowing that the Brody family went to the Bahamas, or following Michael through an underwater labyrinth, as well as the implication of such a creature seeking revenge. The Independent pointed out that "the film was riddled with inconsistencies [and] errors (sharks cannot float or roar like lions)". The special effects were criticized, especially some frames of the shark being speared by the boat's prow, and the mechanisms propelling the shark can be plainly seen in some shots.

Derek Winnert ends his otherwise lukewarm review by stating, "the Bahamas backdrops are pretty and the shark looks as toothsome as ever". Richard Scheib also praises the "beautiful above and below water photography" and the "realistic mechanical shark," although he considers "the melodrama back on dry land ... a bore." Critics commented upon the sepia-toned flashbacks to the first film. A scene with Michael and Thea imitating each other is interspersed with shots from a similar scene in Jaws of Sean (Jay Mello) and Martin Brody. Similarly, the shark's destruction contains footage of Martin Brody aiming at the compressed air tank, saying "Smile, you son of a ... ". The New York Times comments "nothing kills a sequel faster than reverence ... Joseph Sargent, the director, has turned this into a color-by-numbers version of Steven Spielberg's original Jaws."

In a 2019 scholarly article, I.Q. Hunter argues that the film "is valuable as a case study because it is not a ‘standard’ SoBIG ["so bad it's good"] failure. It is neither a weird anomaly with a passionate and visible fan-base, nor the product of an archaic cash-strapped production context. Nor was it a massive flop, redolent of budgetary overkill and artistic vanity. Jaws: The Revenge is simply, by universal consensus, a very bad film."

Accolades

Legacy
The increasing number of sequels in the Jaws series was spoofed in the 1989 film Back to the Future Part II (which was produced by Steven Spielberg and featured Jaws 3 star Lea Thompson), when Marty McFly travels to the year 2015 and sees a theater showing Jaws 19 (fictionally directed by Max Spielberg), with the tagline "This time it's REALLY REALLY personal!". This alludes to the tagline of Jaws: The Revenge: "This time it's personal." After being "attacked" by a promotional volumetric image of the shark outside the theatre, Marty says "the shark still looks fake." In celebration of "Back to the Future Day" in 2015, Universal released a parody trailer for Jaws 19, where the sequels after The Revenge would have included sharks in various environments, prequels, and even a love story titled Jaws 17: Fifty Scales of Grey.

The film is listed in Golden Raspberry Award founder John Wilson's book The Official Razzie Movie Guide as one of The 100 Most Enjoyably Bad Movies Ever Made.

Other media
Novelization

The novelization was written by Hank Searls, who also adapted Jaws 2. While Searls' Jaws 2 novelization was based on an earlier draft of that film and was significantly different from the finished film, his Jaws: The Revenge novelization sticks fairly close to the final film, although it does contain some extra subplots. The novel contains a subplot in which Hoagie is a government agent and he transports laundered money. The only reference to this in the film is when Michael Brody asks "What do you do when you're not flying people?" to which Hoagie replies, "I deliver laundry." In Searls' novel, the character of Jake is ultimately killed by the shark; Jake was originally supposed to die in the film, but the script was changed to allow him to survive.

The novelization suggests that the shark may be acting under the influence of a vengeful voodoo witch doctor (who has a feud with the Brody family), and the shark's apparent revenge has magical implications. Taken from the earlier drafts of the screenplay, the shark is directed by a voodoo curse laid by Papa Jacques, a Haitian witch doctor. Film scholar I.Q. Hunter explains, "The revenge of the title is, therefore, Papa Jacques’ and not the shark’s, which entirely changes the story’s meaning: the shark, impelled by ‘stranger forces man could never understand,’ is an instrument of postcolonial revenge." This also explains the strange psychic connection Ellen and the shark have with each other. The plot was deleted as it strayed too far away from the plot of the killer shark. However, at one point in the theatrical version, Michael Brody says, "Come on, sharks don't commit murder. Tell me you don't believe in that voodoo."

The novelization includes additional scenes that were not included in the final cut of the film, including chapters from the shark's point of view where it is explained that it doesn't understand why it is acting the way it is, as well as an attack on a preppy windsurfer, a drunken newscaster seeing the shark off the side of his yacht, and a relationship between Ellen Brody and a gangster who later meets his demise in the sea with the shark.

Future
In July 2018, Steven Spielberg expressed interest in a Jaws prequel film focusing on the 1945 sinking of the USS Indianapolis, featuring a younger version of Robert Shaw's Quint in a supporting capacity. In May 2020, Shaw's grandson Ferdia Shaw expressed interest in potentially portraying the young Quint in the future, should the film ever be produced.

See also
 List of killer shark films
 List of films considered the worst

References

External links

 
 Jaws: The Revenge'' at the TCM Movie Database
 
 
 
 jawsmovie.com

1987 films
1987 horror films
American natural horror films
American sequel films
Alternative sequel films
1980s English-language films
American films about revenge
Films about sharks
Films about dysfunctional families
Films directed by Joseph Sargent
Films set in the Bahamas
Films set in Massachusetts
Films shot in California
Films set on beaches
Films set on fictional islands
Films shot in Los Angeles
Films shot in Martha's Vineyard
Films shot in the Bahamas
4
Films about shark attacks
Universal Pictures films
Films scored by Michael Small
Films based on works by Peter Benchley
Films based on American novels
1980s American films